Romancing in Thin Air ("High-Altitude Romance II") is a 2012 Hong Kong-Chinese contemporary romantic drama film directed by Johnnie To, and starring Louis Koo and Sammi Cheng.

Plot
While onstage to receive an acting award, Hong Kong screen god Michael Lau (Louis Koo) proposes to his mainland co-star, Ding Yuanyuan (Gao Yuanyuan). At the paparazzi-packed wedding reception, however, the bride runs away with her first love, coal miner Zhang Xing (Wang Baoqiang).

Michael goes on an alcoholic bender, and has the unlikely coincidence of tumbling into the back of a truck bound for Shangri-La County, in northwest Yunnan province, China. At Deep Woods Hotel, a ranch-style guesthouse 3,800 metres up in the mountains, the lovelorn Michael falls seriously ill with altitude sickness and is nursed back to health by owner Sue (Sammi Cheng) and the local doctor (Tien Niu).

Sue was a onetime art student from Hong Kong who worked there while studying in China and fell for the place and its owner, Yang Xiaotian (Li Guangjie). Seven years ago, Xiaotian went into the vast forest surrounding the guesthouse to rescue a young boy and never returned. Hoping he is still alive, Sue continues to run the place with two assistants.

Michael sobers up and discovers that Sue was an early member years ago of his international fan club. A flashback reveals a parallel romance in which Michael was instrumental in bringing Tian and Sue together. The two bond. Meanwhile, Michael's manager, Barbara (Huang Yi), is still anxiously trying to trace him. And one day, a raggedy rucksack belonging to Xiaotian is found in the forest, and Sue's hopes rise that her husband is still alive.

Cast
 Louis Koo as Liu Baiqian/Michael Liu
 Sammi Cheng as Sau/Sue
 Li Guangjie as Yang Xiaotian
 Gao Yuanyuan as Ding Yuanyuan
 Wang Baoqiang as Zhang Xing
 Huang Yi as Barbara, Michael's manager
 Tien Niu as doctor
 Wilfred Lau as Xiaolei, Barbara's assistant
 Yang Yi as Sue's chubby assistant/Teeny
 Sun Jiayi as Sue's taller assistant/Beauty
 Fu Chuanjie as priest
 Li Haitao as search party leader
 Chan Kung as mechanic
 Ji Chen as Xiaotian, in film
 Yang Zhongliang as grandfather, in film
 Zhao Yinlou as grandmother, in film
 Gesanglamu as Xiaoliang's sister, in film
 Hung Wai-leung as Michael's assistant
 Mak Kai-kwong as commercials director
 Calvin Lam as reporter
 Elanie Tsang as reporter
 Lo Kim-wah as film's executive director
 Fu Shusheng as grandfather
 Xu Feifei as grandmother
 Li Qiuer as Xiaoliang's sister
 Jiang Binshen as professor

Reception
Maggie Lee of Variety wrote: "A superstar and his erstwhile fan develop a high-concept romance when thrown together in an inn two-and-a-half miles above sea level in Johnnie To's gorgeous-looking escapist [melodrama]". Lee compared it to his previous film "Don't Go Breaking My Heart" calling it "still overwrought but less calculated than the earlier effort" saying it would likely appeal to Valentine's day audiences but not to To's action or arthouse fans.

References

External links
 
 

2012 films
Chinese romantic drama films
Films directed by Johnnie To
2012 romantic drama films
Hong Kong romantic drama films
2010s Cantonese-language films
Films with screenplays by Wai Ka-fai
2010s Mandarin-language films
2010s Hong Kong films